The 1949 Arizona State–Flagstaff Lumberjacks football team was an American football team that represented Arizona State College at Flagstaff (now known as Northern Arizona University) in the Border Conference during the 1949 college football season. In their first and only year under head coach Emil Ladyko, the Lumberjacks compiled a 1–6–1 record (0–3 against conference opponents), was outscored by a total of 261 to 102, and finished last of nine teams in the Border Conference.

The team played its home games at Skidmore Field in Flagstaff, Arizona.

Schedule

References

Arizona State-Flagstaff
Northern Arizona Lumberjacks football seasons
Arizona State-Flagstaff Lumberjacks football